The Knight's Cross of the Iron Cross (German: Ritterkreuz des Eisernen Kreuzes) and its variants were the highest military award in Nazi Germany. Recipients are grouped by grades of the Knight's Cross. During World War II, 23 German sailors and officers of the Schnellboot (Fast Attack Craft) service, which was a part of the Kriegsmarine, received the Knight's Cross of the Iron Cross. Of these, 8 officers received the Knight's Cross of the Iron Cross with Oak Leaves (Ritterkreuz des Eisernen Kreuzes mit Eichenlaub).

Background
The Knight's Cross of the Iron Cross and its higher grades were based on four separate enactments. The first enactment,  of 1 September 1939 instituted the Iron Cross, the Knight's Cross of the Iron Cross and the Grand Cross of the Iron Cross. Article 2 of the enactment mandated that the award of a higher class be preceded by the award of all preceding classes. As the war progressed, some of the recipients of the Knight's Cross distinguished themselves further and a higher grade, the Knight's Cross of the Iron Cross with Oak Leaves, was instituted. The Oak Leaves, as they were commonly referred to, were based on the enactment  of 3 June 1940. In 1941, two higher grades of the Knight's Cross were instituted. The enactment  of 28 September 1941 introduced the Knight's Cross of the Iron Cross with Oak Leaves and Swords and the Knight's Cross of the Iron Cross with Oak Leaves, Swords and Diamonds. At the end of 1944 the final grade, the Knight's Cross of the Iron Cross with Golden Oak Leaves, Swords, and Diamonds, based on the enactment  of 29 December 1944, became the final variant of the Knight's Cross authorized.

Recipients
The Oberkommando der Wehrmacht kept separate Knight's Cross lists, one for each of the three military branches, Heer (Army), Kriegsmarine (Navy), Luftwaffe (Air force) and for the Waffen-SS. Within each of these lists a unique sequential number was assigned to each recipient. The same numbering paradigm was applied to the higher grades of the Knight's Cross, one list per grade.

Knight's Cross with Oak Leaves
The Knight's Cross with Oak Leaves was based on the enactment Reichsgesetzblatt I S. 849 of 3 June 1940. The last officially announced number for the Oak Leaves was 843.

Knight's Cross of the Iron Cross
The Knight's Cross of the Iron Cross is based on the enactment Reichsgesetzblatt I S. 1573 of 1 September 1939 Verordnung über die Erneuerung des Eisernen Kreuzes (Regulation of the renewing of the Iron Cross).

Notes

References
Specific

General

 
 Kurowski, Franz (2007). Korvettenkapitän Werner Töniges Der erste Eichenlaubträger der Schnellbootwaffe. Flechsig Verlag. .

External links

Lists of Knight's Cross of the Iron Cross recipients
 Schnellboote